Venacio Coñoepán or simply Coñoepán was a Mapuche chief active in the Mapuche resistance to the Occupation of Araucanía (1861-1883). At the founding of Temuco in 1881 in the northern shores of Cautín River Venacio Coñoepán and other chiefs from Choll-Choll met with minister Manuel Recabarren and asked him to not advance further. Later in the same year Venacio Coñoepán headed a parliament that united different Mapuche factions against Chile.

References

Bibliography 

19th-century Mapuche people
People of the Occupation of Araucanía
Indigenous leaders of the Americas
People from Araucanía Region
Year of birth missing